This article lists the results for the Japan national football team between 1940 and 1949.

Because the opponents were considered to be puppet states and not internationally recognized, the matches except for the Philippines match, were not recorded by FIFA.

After World War II, the Japan national football team were banned from attending any international football games from 1945 to 1951.

1940

1942

References

Japan national football team results
1940s in Japanese sport